As part of their tour to North America and Europe in 1972–73, the New Zealand national rugby union team faced Barbarian F.C. (the Barbarians) at the National Stadium in Cardiff in their last match in Great Britain. It is considered to be one of the best rugby union matches ever played, and featured what has been described as "the greatest try ever", scored by Gareth Edwards in the first few minutes. The Barbarians won the game 23–11. It was the first time New Zealand lost to the Barbarians.

Match

Team selection
The Barbarians selected a strong team for the match; 12 of the starting line-up had been part of the British Lions' touring party to New Zealand in 1971. In keeping with Barbarians tradition, English lock Bob Wilkinson and Welsh flanker Tommy David were uncapped for their countries, while Llanelli RFC's Phil Bennett was the heir apparent to the now-retired Barry John at fly-half. David and wing John Bevan were late additions to the side; David was promoted from the replacements' bench after Swansea RFC's Mervyn Davies came down with the flu, resulting in Derek Quinnell being moved to Number 8 to accommodate David at blindside flanker, while Bevan had been called up from a scheduled game for Cardiff RFC that day to replace the injured Gerald Davies, another 1971 British Lion. The strength of the Barbarians' side led to the media billing the match as the fifth test of the 1971 Lions tour.

Summary

First half
The Barbarians kicked off towards the River Taff end of the stadium, and the opening exchanges were dominated by back-and-forth kicks, with J. P. R. Williams and Mike Gibson giving the Barbarians good field position inside the New Zealand half. After the Barbarians failed to recover possession at their own ensuing lineout, New Zealand winger Bryan Williams kicked deep into Barbarian territory; Phil Bennett recovered possession near his goal line, and with nearly the entire length of the field between him and the New Zealand goal line, he started upfield, sidestepping past three tackles, as encouraged by coach Carwyn James immediately before the game. Bennett passed to J. P. R. Williams, who managed to offload the ball after Bryan Williams had tackled him around the neck. Still deep in Barbarians territory, the ball then passed through four pairs of Barbarian hands (John Pullin, John Dawes, Tommy David and Derek Quinnell) before Gareth Edwards, slipping between two team-mates and seemingly intercepting the last pass, finished with a diving try in the left-hand corner, 22 seconds after Bennett picked up the ball. Bennett's conversion attempt fell short, giving the Barbarians a 4–0 lead inside four minutes. Commentary for the match was originally supposed to be provided by Bill McLaren; however, he was recovering from the flu, so Cliff Morgan had been called in on the day to replace him. Morgan's commentary of the opening try is considered to be among the best ever.

However, after such a promising start, the Barbarians then spent much of the ensuing 20 minutes defending. The All Blacks came storming back into the game and created several scoring changes over the next 10 minutes. After winning a turnover inside the Barbarians 22 following an errant pass from Barbarian prop Ray McLoughlin, fly-half Bob Burgess narrowly missed a drop-goal attempt. A few minutes later, only great covering defence from J. P. R. Williams stopped an almost certain try after Bruce Robertson had put a grubber kick through for his winger Grant Batty to chase. New Zealand scrum-half Sid Going was then penalised for not putting the ball into a scrum straight 5 yards out from the Barbarians' line, killing the good momentum their forwards had built up in the preceding passages of play. 

The Barbarians then enjoyed their own stretch of attacking chances, with Gibson pouncing on a New Zealand knock-on in midfield to set up a counter-attack that was only thwarted by a timely interception by Robertson. A few minutes later, Edwards scythed through the All Black line after a tap-penalty, giving the Barbarians an excellent attacking platform a few yards from the New Zealand line, only for hooker Pullin to be penalised for having his foot up early in the scrum. David Duckham then almost got around New Zealand's defence on the right wing with his first touch of the ball all match, but Burgess produced an excellent covering tackle to cut out the danger. Cliff Morgan commented here that the action was "unceasing" – barely 15 minutes had been played.

Momentum then swung back New Zealand's way and they pinned the Barbarians deep inside their half. Barbarian debutant Tommy David stopped a promising attacking move, taking an excellent catch near his own line after Bryan Williams' up-and-under, before J. P. R. Williams made a potentially try-saving tackle on Batty who had brilliantly recovered another Robertson grubber kick. A desperate clearing kick from Bennett and Quinnell winning two New Zealand lineouts in two minutes ensured that their four-point cushion was maintained, before Duckham, starting inside his own 25-yard line, evaded three All Black defenders with successive side-steps to release David, Fergus Slattery and Willie John McBride in succession, until New Zealand flanker Scown thwarted a certain try for Bevan with a last-ditch tackle. Within minutes of this, however, the All Blacks were once again back on the offensive, with Batty evading Gibson and J. P. R. Williams on the left wing, but his chip-and-chase was thwarted by Bennett covering across to clear the danger.

A few minutes later, Bennett would covert a penalty for the Barbarians after Alex Wyllie had been penalised for side-entry at a ruck, giving the Barbarians a 7-0 lead with about nine minutes of the first half remaining, and it was during these nine minutes that the Barbarians took control of the game. After a clearing kick by Going, Duckham produced the second of his two first-half swashbuckling runs, this time beating five All Black defenders – including a dummy on Ian Hurst that even fooled the cameraman – setting up a superb move that ended with flanker Slattery throwing a one-handed, over-the-head American football-style pass to Dawes who scored a try in the corner, only for Slattery's pass to be adjudged as having gone forward. However, from the ensuing scrum five yards from the New Zealand line, pressure from Edwards forced Going to fumble the ball, which allowed Slattery to scoop up the loose ball and go over for the Barbarians' second try of the half; Bennett's conversion made the score 13-0. In the final minute of the first half, a poor pass from Going to Burgess led to the All Black fly-half throwing an interception to Quinnell. The ball was spread wide to Bevan, who managed to shrug off tackles from Bryan Williams, Ian Hurst and Joe Karam to score a try in the left corner. Bennett's missed conversion from the touchline gave the Barbarians a 17–0 advantage at half-time.

Second half
Refusing to go down without a fight, the All Blacks started the second half strongly, with Hamish Macdonald brilliantly claiming Karam's kickoff, and Burgess launching a nasty up-and-under that J. P. R. Williams failed to claim on his own line, but New Zealand captain Ian Kirkpatrick could not gather the rebound cleanly and knocked on over the line. A few plays later, Slattery was penalised for offside at a maul, but Karam missed the difficult penalty attempt from the right hand side of the pitch. Peter Whiting then also knocked on after a promising attacking move set up by a burst upfield from Kirkpatrick, but Edwards was penalised for not putting the ball in straight at the ensuing scrum, giving Karam a much easier attempt at goal, which he made to cut the deficit to 17–3. J. P. R. Williams then once again displayed his defensive prowess by stopping Bryan Williams in a one-on-one situation that would have otherwise resulted in a certain try for the All Blacks, but the Barbarians were powerless to stop Bryan Williams breaking through the line a few moments later and feeding winger Batty for New Zealand's first try of the match. Karam missed the conversion, but the All Blacks were nonetheless very much back in contention, trailing 17–7 with barely eight minutes of the second half gone.

A missed penalty goal attempt by Bennett aside, New Zealand controlled much of the possession and territory for the next 15 minutes or so, but the Barbarian's stout defence and a few handling errors meant that the All Blacks couldn't capitalise. Half-way through the second half, Going finally succumbed to an ankle injury he had been nursing for most of the half and was replaced by Lin Colling. More good defence from the Barbarians led to Bennett attempting a long-range penalty from just inside his own half that only just missed to the left of the posts. A flurry of kicking exchanges eventually led to Batty taking issue with a late tackle on him by David that was not penalised by referee Georges Domercq, and the two players engaged in a tussle on the touch-line; Batty's involvement and behaviour, though understandable, resulted in him being booed by the partisan crowd every time he touched the ball for the rest of the match. Indeed, these boos intensified a few minutes later when Batty was penalised for shoving Duckham after the whistle had gone. 

However, these two incidents seemed to reignite the game. A somewhat speculative cross-field kick by Hurst was picked up by Batty, who then not only evaded the tackle of Dawes but also brilliantly chipped ahead over the head of J. P. R. Williams which he recovered to score his second try of the match; even though the crowd noise was filled with boos for Batty, they nonetheless acknowledged the skill with an appreciative round of applause. Karam, however, once again, could not add the conversion, but New Zealand had successfully cut the deficit to just six points, now trailing 17-11 with just over 10 minutes to go.

However, the Barbarians then produced one of the highlights of the game to seal victory; commentator Bill McLaren would later describe it in his 1991 documentary "Bill's Best Bits" as being on par with "The Greatest Try Ever Scored", and a passage of play that made you "gasp in wonder". Beginning from a lineout just outside New Zealand's 25, the ball was kept in play for over 90 seconds (a very rare feat for rugby matches of that era) and all 15 Barbarian players touched the ball at least once in the passage of play. Featuring a remarkable reverse pass by Edwards, two sniping runs apiece by Duckham and Gibson, a try-saving tackle by Karam and interception by Colling, Slattery's accurate pass put J. P. R. Williams in space who then side-stepped Karam to score in the corner. Bennett slotted the conversion from the right touchline, receiving a cheer almost as loud as the one that greeted the try, to give the Barbarians a virtually unassailable 23–11 lead with only a few minutes to go.

However, the All Blacks came roaring back with an attack of their own, with Hurst putting Robertson through. Robertson tried to emulate Batty's chip over the head of J. P. R. Williams, but Williams read Robertson's idea and charged the kick down, likely saving yet another try in the process. Although the All Blacks continued to pressure for the remaining minutes and during injury-time, all their forays into the Barbarians 25 were snuffed out by more good Barbarians defence. The Barbarians too managed to launch a couple of their own attacks, with Bevan twice running out of defence brilliantly, the second of which ended when he chose to grubber-kick ahead, not noticing that J. P. R. Williams was free on his left shoulder who would have certainly scored were he to have passed. Batty conjured one last attacking chance for his side, escaping down the left flank, but his inside pass was dropped by Robertson. One final attacking move for the Barbarians was brought to an end after Gibson lost his footing after a cut back inside and knocked on, after which the final whistle sounded, and the resultant cheers from the crowd was instantly followed by a mass pitch invasion from all sides. Barbarians captain John Dawes was lifted onto the shoulders of the crowd, as was scrum-half Edwards in recognition of his remarkable try scored in the opening minutes of the match.

In a remarkable piece of commentary, Cliff Morgan said at the final whistle:

After the players had started making their way down the tunnel, he would add:

Details

Touch judges:
E. M. Lewis (Wales)
D. O. Spyer (England)

Legacy

Often known simply as "that try", the try is frequently mentioned as the greatest ever scored or one of the greatest. In a UK poll conducted by Channel 4 in 2002, Edwards's try was voted number 20 in the list of the 100 Greatest Sporting Moments. The 40th anniversary of the try sparked renewed interest.

References

External links
Video of the try

History of rugby union
New Zealand
Barbarian
1972–73 in British rugby union
1973 in New Zealand rugby union
January 1973 sports events in the United Kingdom